Lom (Rumpus) is the sixth studio album by Bosnian-Serbian pop-folk recording artist Seka Aleksić. It was released 2 May 2012 through the record label Grand Production.

Track listing

References

2012 albums
Seka Aleksić albums
Grand Production albums